Leighshe Zanell Jacobs (born 6 April 1985) is a South African cricketer who currently plays for Boland. She plays primarily as a right-arm leg break bowler. She played two Test matches for South Africa in 2003. She has previously played for Western Province.

References

External links
 
 

1985 births
Living people
Cricketers from Cape Town
South African women cricketers
South Africa women Test cricketers
Western Province women cricketers
Boland women cricketers
20th-century South African women
21st-century South African women